Cheryl Chambers (born 18 April 1968) is an Australian basketball coach and retired professional basketball player. She currently is head coach for the Southside Flyers in the WNBL.

Career

WNBL
Chambers played 261 games in the Women's National Basketball League (playing for the Melbourne East, Coburg, Bulleen Boomers and Melbourne Tigers) and is a Life Member of the WNBL. After her playing career, Chambers went on to coach the Bulleen Boomers from 2001 through to 2009. In her time there, she won the WNBL Coach of the Year Award twice in 2004–05 and 2008–09 respectively.

Following on from stints with Australia's U-19 national team, Knox Raiders in the SEABL and an assistant coach position back with the Melbourne Boomers under Guy Molloy, Chambers returned to the league after an eight-year hiatus from a head coaching role. During her time in Sydney, Chambers would win a WNBL Championship and again take home the WNBL Coach of the Year.

In 2019, Chambers signed as head coach to the newly rebranded Southside Flyers back in her home city of Melbourne.

Coaching record

WNBL 

|-  
| align="left" |Bulleen
| align="left" |2001–02
| 17 
| 4
| 13
|
| align="center" |6th of 8
|–
|–
|–
|–
|
|-  
| align="left" |Bulleen
| align="left" |2002–03
| 21 
| 6
| 15
|
| align="center" |6th of 8
|–
|–
|–
|–
|
|-  
| align="left" |Bulleen
| align="left" |2003–04
| 21 
| 11
| 10
|
| align="center" |6th of 8
|–
|–
|–
|–
|
|-  
| align="left" |Bulleen
| align="left" |2004–05
| 21 
| 16
| 5
|
| align="center" |2nd of 8
|2
|0 
|2
|
| align="center" |Lost Preliminary final
|-  
| align="left" |Bulleen
| align="left" |2005–06
| 21 
| 13
| 8
|
| align="center" |4th of 8
|1
|0 
|1
|
| align="center" |Lost Semi-final
|-  
| align="left" |Bulleen
| align="left" |2006–07
| 21 
| 12
| 9
|
| align="center" |5th of 8
|–
|–
|–
|–
|
|-  
| align="left" |Bulleen
| align="left" |2007–08
| 24 
| 11
| 13
|
| align="center" |5th of 10
|–
|–
|–
|–
|
|-  
| align="left" |Bulleen
| align="left" |2008–09
| 22 
| 17
| 5
|
| align="center" |2nd of 10
|3
|1 
|2
|
| align="center" |Lost Grand Final
|- ! style="background:#FDE910;"
| align="left" |Sydney
| align="left" |2016–17
| 24 
| 18
| 6
|
| align="center" |1st of 8
|4
|4
|0
|
| align="center" |Won Grand Final
|-
| align="left" |Sydney
| align="left" |2017–18
| 21 
| 14
| 7
|
| align="center" |2nd of 8 
|2
|0
|2
|
| align="center" |Lost Semi-final
|-
| align="left" |Sydney
| align="left" |2018–19
| 21 
| 2
| 19
|
| align="center" |8th of 8
|–
|–
|–
|–
|
|-
| align="left" |Southside
| align="left" |2019–20
| 21
| 17
| 4
|
| align="center" |1st of 8
|4
|2
|2
|
| align="center" |Lost Grand Final
|- ! style="background:#FDE910;"
| align="left" |Southside
| align="left" |2020
| 13 
| 11
| 2
|
| align="center" |1st of 8
|3
|3
|0
|
| align="center" |Won Grand Final
|-class="sortbottom"
| align="left" |Career
| ||268||152||116|||| ||19||10||9||

References

Living people
Australian women's basketball players
Australian women's basketball coaches
Melbourne Boomers players
Bulleen Boomers coaches
1968 births